Haddinnet, also transliterated as Hadnet, is a tabia or municipality in the Dogu'a Tembien district of the Tigray Region of Ethiopia. The tabia centre is in Addi Idaga village, located approximately 6.5 km to the northeast of the woreda town Hagere Selam.

Geography 

The tabia is located on the southern and northern slopes of the Tsili ridge in the northern part of Dogu'a Tembien.  The highest peak is Dabba Selama (2630 m a.s.l.) (not to be confounded with the homonymous monastery) and the lowest place along Agefet River (1720 m a.s.l.).

Geology 

From the higher to the lower locations, the following geological formations are present:
 Phonolite plugs
 Upper basalt
 Interbedded lacustrine deposits  
 Lower basalt
 Amba Aradam Formation
 Agula Shale 
 Antalo Limestone 
 Adigrat Sandstone
 Edaga Arbi Glacials  
 Quaternary alluvium and freshwater tufa

Climate 
The rainfall pattern shows a very high seasonality with 70 to 80% of the annual rain falling in July and August. Mean temperature in Addi Idaga is 20.4 °C, oscillating between average daily minimum of 11.5 °C and maximum of 28.9 °C. The contrasts between day and night air temperatures are much larger than seasonal contrasts.

Springs 
As there is very poor baseflow in the permanent rivers, the presence of springs is of utmost importance for the local people. The main springs in the tabia are:
 Ruba Weyni, fed by seepage from May Leiba reservoir
 May Damo in Atsa
 Abune Ayezgi in Debre Medhanit

Reservoirs 
In this area with rains that last only for a couple of months per year, reservoirs of different sizes allow harvesting runoff from the rainy season for further use in the dry season. Overall they suffer from siltation. Yet, they strongly contribute to greening the landscape, either through irrigation or seepage water. Main reservoirs are:
 May Leiba reservoir, in Ayninbirkekin tabia, constructed in 1998
 Traditional surface water harvesting ponds, particularly in places without permanent springs, called rahaya
 Horoyo, household ponds, recently constructed through campaigns

Vegetation and exclosures
The tabia holds several exclosures, areas that are set aside for regreening. Wood harvesting and livestock range are not allowed there. Besides effects on biodiversity, water infiltration, protection from flooding, sediment deposition, carbon sequestration, people commonly have economic benefits from these exclosures through grass harvesting, beekeeping and other non-timber forest products. The local inhabitants also consider it as “land set aside for future generations”.

Settlements 
The tabia centre Addi Idaga holds a few administrative offices, a health post, a primary school, and some small shops. Saturday is the market day. There are a few more primary schools across the tabia. The main other populated places are:

Agriculture and livelihood 
The population lives essentially from crop farming, supplemented with off-season work in nearby towns. The land is dominated by farmlands which are clearly demarcated and are cropped every year. Hence the agricultural system is a permanent upland farming system. The farmers have adapted their cropping systems to the spatio-temporal variability in rainfall. Large irrigated lands have been established in Addi Idaga. The youngsters of the tabia have established wide grasslands on mountain ridges; the grass is mainly sold for thatching.

History and culture

History 
The history of the tabia is strongly confounded with the history of Tembien. In the 1930s, during the Italian invasion, Ksad Azef was an important battlefield during the First Battle of Tembien. It is a place through which the Tembien highlands could relatively easily be accessed when coming from the Gheralta lowlands. The Italians called it Passo Abaro. Italian Blackshirt soldiers left a memorial stone on top of the nearby Mount Dabba Selama.

Religion and churches 
Most inhabitants are Orthodox Christians. The following churches are located in the tabia:

Inda Siwa, the local beer houses 
In the main villages, there are traditional beer houses (Inda Siwa), often in unique settings, which are a good place for resting and chatting with the local people. The most renown in the tabia are all located in the tabia centre Addi Idaga:
  Yergalem Assefa
 Mulubrhan Hagos
 Mihret Abrha

Roads and communication 

The main road Mekelle – Hagere Selam – Abiy Addi runs 5–10 km south of the tabia. People need to walk long distances to catch a bus. Further, a rural access road links most villages to the main asphalt road.

Tourism 
Its mountainous nature and proximity to Mekelle makes the tabia fit for tourism.

Touristic attractions 
 Tsili ridge
 Tinsehe waterfall
 Dabba Selama mountain, with Erica arborea forest, church, and a memorial stone of the 1930s, left by soldiers of the Italian army, a metres-wide phonolite with inscriptions.
 Kidane Mihret rock church in Ab'aro, surrounded by tufa plugs, springs and a cluster of trees. The church was established in widened caves of the tufa plug.

Geotouristic sites 
The high variability of geological formations and the rugged topography invites for geological and geographic tourism or "geotourism". Geosites in the tabia include:

Birdwatching 
Birdwatching (for the species, see the main Dogu'a Tembien page) can be done particularly in exclosures and forests.  The Wehabit Sillasie church forest bird-watching site is particularly interesting.

Trekking routes 
Trekking routes have been established in this tabia. The tracks are not marked on the ground but can be followed using downloaded .GPX files.
 Trek 21, along the northern side of Tsaliet gorge up to Addi Hamushenai, and further down to Addeha in Kola Tembien
 Trek 23 to the top of Dabba Selama mountain
 Trek 26, over the top of Tsili ridge
 Trek Gh2, from Addi Idaga, down to Gheralta, along the Ab'aro rock church

Accommodation and facilities 
The facilities are very basic.  One may be invited to spend the night in a rural homestead or ask permission to pitch a tent. Hotels are available in Hagere Selam and Mekelle.

More detailed information 
For more details on environment, agriculture, rural sociology, hydrology, ecology, culture, etc., see the overall page on the Dogu'a Tembien district.

Gallery

References 

Dogu'a Tembien
Populated places in the Tigray Region